Kiss Rocks Vegas is a live album and DVD/Blu-ray Disc by the American hard rock band Kiss released on August 26, 2016.  The album was recorded from November 5–23, 2014 during the band's residency at the Hard Rock Hotel and Casino in Las Vegas, Nevada, during their  40th-anniversary tour.

Kiss Rocks Vegas was released in cinemas worldwide on May 25, 2016, and was later released on pay-per-view on June 14, 2016.

Track listing

DVD/Blu-ray

Personnel
Kiss
Paul Stanley – vocals, rhythm guitar
Gene Simmons – vocals, bass
Eric Singer – drums, percussion, vocals
Tommy Thayer – lead guitar, backing vocals

Charts

References

Kiss (band) compilation albums
2016 compilation albums
2016 live albums
Kiss (band) live albums
Albums recorded at the Hard Rock Hotel and Casino (Las Vegas)
Hard Rock Hotel and Casino (Las Vegas)